Chris Brown (born 11 September 1978) is an Australian veterinarian, television presenter and author. He is best known for the television series Bondi Vet, which began screening in 2009. He hosts The Open Road with Doctor Chris on CBS. In Australia, he appears on the lifestyle program The Living Room, and alongside Julia Morris is the presenter of the local version of  I'm a Celebrity...Get Me Out of Here!.

Early life and education 
Brown was born and grew up in the suburbs of Merewether Heights, Newcastle, New South Wales, where his father was a local vet. He attended Merewether Heights Public School and Merewether High School. His first pet was a cow called Bridget. He graduated from The University of Sydney with First Class Honours in Veterinary Science in 2001.

After graduating from university, Brown began work at a clinic in Sydney's North Shore. He travelled to remote Aboriginal communities in the Northern Territory to treat animals.

Media career 
Brown was discovered after a media manager heard him telling stories in a Sydney bar in 2003.

Brown's first television presenting role as a vet was on Harry's Practice in 2003, for which he was nominated for a "Most Popular New Talent" Logie Award. He became a presenter on Channel Nine's Burke's Backyard in 2004 and made regular appearances on Today. His first book, The Family Guide to Pets, was released in 2005 and sold over 25,000 copies. In 2008, he also began writing a column called "Pet Page" in Woman's Day magazine and was interviewed on radio stations Triple M and Vega FM.

In 2008, he began Bondi Vet on Network Ten, a factual television program that chronicles his life and work at a veterinary clinic at Bondi Junction. Since 28 September 2013, the show is seen on Saturday mornings in the United States on the CBS network, under the title of Dr. Chris: Pet Vet.

In 2010, Brown became a regular guest panelist on Network Ten's talk show The Project, and he served as a fill-in host for Charlie Pickering before Pickering left.

In 2012, Brown began co-hosting Network Ten's lifestyle show The Living Room with Amanda Keller, Miguel Maestre and Barry Du Bois. Brown presents the travel and pet segments on the program.

On 1 February 2015, Brown began co-hosting the Australian version of I'm a Celebrity...Get Me Out of Here! with Julia Morris, also on Network Ten. He and Morris have co-presented all series to date, from 2015 to 2022.

In March 2017, Brown announced he was stepping down as host of Bondi Vet due to an extensive schedule.

Vet Gone Wild, a series that began airing on Animal Planet (US) in June 2018, features Brown helping animals in various situations outside of Sydney.  He even ventures out to other countries in some episodes.
In 2018, it was announced that he would host a local version of Saturday Night Takeaway alongside Julia Morris. He began hosting on 24 February 2019 on Network 10, with the name Chris & Julia's Sunday Night Takeaway.

In February 2023, it was announced Brown had signed with Seven Network and would be leaving Network 10 in July 2023 after his final hosting duties of I'm a Celebrity...Get Me Out of Here!.

Personal life 
In 2012, Brown dated TV presenter Roz Kelly.

In 2014, Brown dated actress Kassandra Clementi.

Photography has been one of Brown's hobbies since he was a child, and he is now an ambassador for Canon. He stated, "Photography has always been a bit of a secret pleasure for me. I'll often grab a camera before or after work to escape for some 'me' time, and you'll find me with one of my eyes wedged up against the viewfinder, trying to capture that elusive shot."

Brown runs the website 'Drool', where he shares animal stories, tips and sells his photography.

Brown had size 15 feet since he was 14 years old and in his home town the only shoes he could buy to fit were purple and green.

Surfing is one of Brown's hobbies, which he could be seen doing on episodes of Bondi Vet. While surfing in Chile on a 12-foot wave, he got whiplash and tore his groin.

Cricket is Brown's pet cat which he rescued when she came in as a patient on Bondi Vet.

Filmography

References

External links 

 Drool — official website
 Dr Chris Brown – "Today" – Channel Nine
 Chris Brown biography

1978 births
Living people
Australian television presenters
Australian veterinarians
Male veterinarians
People from Newcastle, New South Wales